Sandra Couture (born March 15, 1983 in Saint-Georges, Quebec) is a Canadian soccer player who last played for French club Juvisy of the Division 1 Féminine. She plays as a striker and joined her current club ahead of the 2009–10 season after a successful career at the Université de Montréal with the Montreal Carabins. From 2002 to 2006, Couture scored a team-record 52 goals, was named the Player of the Year once, and was named to the All-Canadian First Team on two occasions. Prior to joining Juvisy in 2009, she worked as an assistant coach at the university after previous injuries delayed her opportunities to start her club career in France. Though, Couture hasn't represented Canada on international level, she has represented her nation at the 2005 and 2007 editions of the Summer Universiade.

References

External links
 UEFA player profile
 StatsFootoFeminin profile 
 (French) Portrait - Sandra Couture, la femme qui marquait des buts in Montreal Carabins Website, November 6, 2006.

1983 births
Living people
Anglophone Quebec people
Women's association football forwards
Canadian women's soccer players
Canadian expatriate soccer players
Expatriate women's footballers in France
Paris FC (women) players
People from Saint-Georges, Quebec
Soccer people from Quebec
USL W-League (1995–2015) players
Laval Comets players